The Villafortuna oil field is an oil field located in Trecate, Piedmont. It was discovered in 1984 and developed by Eni. It began production in 1984 and produces oil.

References

Oil fields in Italy